This is a list of psychedelic literature, works related to psychedelic drugs and the psychedelic experience. Psychedelic literature has also been defined as textual works that arose from the proliferation of psychiatric and psychotherapeutic research with hallucinogens during the 1950s and early 1960s in North America and Europe.

Science of psychedelic drugs

Anthropology of psychedelic drugs

Subjective effects of psychedelic drugs

Political possibilities of psychedelic drugs

Direct inspiration of the psychedelic experience

Periodicals

Psychedelic magazines
 DoubleBlind Mag
 Dragibus Magazine
 The Entheogen Review
 High Frontiers
 Psychedelic Magazine
 Psychedelic Monographs and Essays

Academic journals addressing psychedelics-related topics
 British Journal of Psychiatry
 Drugs and Alcohol Review
 Drugs and Alcohol Today
 Drug Science, Policy and Law
 Harm Reduction Journal
 International Journal of Drug Policy
 Journal of Drug Issues
 Journal of European Neuropsychopharmacology
 Journal of Psychopharmacology
 Therapeutic Advances in Psychopharmacology

Publishers
 Psychedelic Press
 Psychozoic Press

See also
 Erowid
 Psychedelic art
 Psychedelic film

References 

 
Lists of books
Psychology bibliographies
Philosophy bibliographies